Hjálmar Jónsson (born 29 July 1980) is an Icelandic former footballer who played as a defender. During most of his career, he played for IFK Göteborg in Allsvenskan.

Club career
After playing for Icelandic clubs Höttur and Keflavik, he joined Swedish club IFK Göteborg in 2002, a club he has played for since then. On 16 July 2006, he scored his first ever goal for IFK Göteborg against Halmstads BK in a league game.

International career
Jónsson made his debut for Iceland in a January 2002 friendly match against Kuwait.

Career statistics

Club

International

Honours
;IFK Göteborg
Allsvenskan: 2007
Svenska Cupen: 2008, 2012–13, 2014–15
Svenska Supercupen: 2008
Individual
Archangel of the Year: 2007

References

External links

1980 births
Living people
Hjalmar Jonsson
Hjalmar Jonsson
Hjalmar Jonsson
Hjalmar Jonsson
Hjalmar Jonsson
Hjalmar Jonsson
IFK Göteborg players
Allsvenskan players
Expatriate footballers in Sweden
Association football defenders
Íþróttafélagið Höttur players